A born-again virgin (also known as a secondary), is a person who, after having engaged in sexual intercourse, makes some type of commitment not to be sexually active again until marriage. The term has been used among evangelical and fundamentalist Christians, who place a strong emphasis on abstinence from premarital and extramarital relations.

In popular culture
In season 9 of the popular medical drama Grey's Anatomy, Dr. April Kepner, then an attending physician at Seattle Grace-Mercy West Hospital, announces that she is "revirginizing" after having sex with fellow resident Dr. Jackson Avery. This does not last long, as she has sex with him again at the end of the episode.

In Season 3 Episode 16 of The Last Man on Earth, Todd reclaimed his virginity prior to his wedding by abstaining from intercourse with his fiance, Melissa, until their wedding.

In the episode "Luanne Virgin 2.0" of King of the Hill, Luanne and Peggy restore their virginity by participating in a ceremony headed by their minister.

In Season 9, Episode 8 of Supernatural (American TV series), Rock and a Hard Place, Sam and Dean both reclaim their virginity in order to investigate a missing persons case revolving around a chastity group, which all the victims were once a part of.

See also
 Born again (Christianity)
 Celibacy
 Chastity
 Fornication
 Premarital sex
 Sexual ethics
 Slut shaming
 Virginity
 Virginity pledge

References

Celibacy
Evangelicalism
Hymen
Virginity